Masoud Molavi Vardanjani (28 April 1968 – 14 November 2019) was an Iranian scientist killed by Iranian intelligence in Istanbul, Turkey. It was claimed he was part of Iranian cyber defense program part of IRGC and Iranian defense ministry, then turned critic of the government he had a Telegram channel titled blackbox which released informational documents about corruption in office of the supreme leader, Iranian judicial system and Iranian armed forces, before migrating from Iran he was called a genius inventor. Reuters had reported that Iranian diplomatic officers of Iranian consulate in Turkey helped assassinate him.

Academic life 
He had a BS Bachelor of Science in construction engineering from Islamic Azad University Najaf Abad Branch and Artificial Intelligence and robotics from Tehran University.

Killing 
According to Iran wire citing TRT journalist, Azari Jahromi, Iranian telecommunications minister had threatened him before he was killed.

In 2020, an Iranian embassy in Ankara staff member was arrested in this assassination case.

References

External links 

 

Iranian expatriates in Turkey
University of Tehran alumni
Arizona State University alumni
Islamic Azad University alumni
Assassinated Iranian people
Scientists from Isfahan
1968 births
2019 deaths